The title of Shakespeare's Jest Book has been given to two quite different early Tudor period collections of humorous anecdotes, published within a few years of each other. The first was The Hundred Merry Tales, the only surviving complete edition of which was published in 1526. The other, published about 1530, was titled Merry Tales and Quick Answers and originally contained 113 stories. An augmented edition of 1564 contained 140.

The explanation of the title comes from a reference to one or other collection in William Shakespeare's play Much Ado About Nothing in which the character Beatrice has been accused 'that I had my good wit out of the 100 Merry Tales' (II.sc.1). By that time it seems that the two works were being confounded with each other.

Contents
The stories in the 1526 Hundred Merry Tales are largely set in England, mostly in London or the surrounding area, and contain the stock figures of stupid clergymen, unfaithful wives, and Welshmen, the butt of many jokes at the time. Most are followed by a comment on what can be learned from the story. The book's Victorian editors identified a few Italian and French sources from earlier centuries but it was mainly a depository for popular lore that was to figure in more focussed collections published later. In particular, one story there (24) features the proverbial villagers of Gotham. Another (40) concerns the raffish priest and poet John Skelton, of whom many more stories were to be told in the Merie Tales of Skelton (1566).

Merry Tales and Quick Answers has a wider and more literary range of reference. Three of these and yet one more,  (10), were to figure later among La Fontaine's Fables. The story of the young widow is a close translation of a fable that had appeared in the Latin collection of Laurentius Abstemius only three decades earlier.

The anecdotes recorded in the work range from Classical history to near contemporary times across the cities of Europe. One scholar comments that the work is ‘mostly drawn from Erasmus and Poggio Bracciolini, but acknowledges little of its inheritance beyond ascribing a handful of its jests to Plutarch’. It certainly owes to Poggio a good deal of its scabrous and scatological content. The following is a list of the principal stories that are common to the English jest book and Poggio's Facetiae.
 1.  – Poggio tale 162
 4.  _ Poggio's 227
 6.  – Poggio 12 (Hurwood)
 18.  (later known as "The ring of Hans Carvel") – Poggio's 133
 28.  – Poggio's 130
 31.  – Poggio's 230
 36.  – Poggio's 184
 39.  – Poggio's 176
 57.  – Poggio's 259
 66.  – Poggio's 137
 73. , which takes place in Florence in Poggio's 147
 76.  – Poggio 219
 87  – Poggio 56 (Hurwood)
 90.  – Poggio's 194
 98.  – Poggio's 179
 99.  – Poggio's 250

References
 Hurwood, B.J. (translator), The Facetiae of Giovanni Francesco Poggio Braccioline, London 1968.
 Lisieux, I. (publisher), The Facetiae or Jocose Tales of Poggio, vol. 2, Paris 1879, archived online

External links
 Shakespeare Jest Books, (London 1864) at Google Books

English books
Comedy books
William Shakespeare
16th-century books